CORA (standing for Coriolis Ocean database ReAnalysis) is a global oceanographic temperature and salinity dataset produced and maintained by the French institute IFREMER. Most of those data are real-time data coming from different types of platforms such as research vessels, profilers, underwater gliders, drifting buoys, moored buoys, sea mammals and ships of opportunity.

Description 
This in-situ dataset produced by the French institute Ifremer in the framework of the European project MyOcean and French project CORIOLIS is a picture of the content of the operational oceanographic database CORIOLIS. This database is the main tool of Coriolis project which is a global data assembly center of in situ data: such as US-GODAE centre of Monterey in California.
The latest version of CORA product is v3.3, it covers the years 1990 up to 2011 and has been released in July 2012. Observations are profiles distributed on measured levels (pressure or depth) and organized by dates of measurement and type of platform.
Main users of CORA dataset are ocean modelers who needs to constraint and initialize their model. CORA is free of access and can be download via CORIOLIS website in netCDF file format. The main different of CORA dataset with other available datasets is that CORA provides data at depth levels where measurements were made rather than at standard levels such as in World Ocean Atlas or ENACT3. In addition data in CORA are retrieved from Coriolis database where each profile is visually checked by specialist operators if suspicious.

Validation procedure

Validation in database 
 duplicate observation check
 automatic checks (spikes, climatology, monotonic depth, valid date/position,...)
 objective analysis (ISAS software with 21 days, 300 km covariance ray): suspicious observations are visualized by an operator

Validation post extraction 
 second duplicate observation check (detection and choice parameters tuned)
 refined climatological test
 XBT depth correction
 second objective analysis with tuned parameters: anomalies are visualized
 ARGO special diagnostics

Data sources 
The CORA dataset is designed for operational oceanography, so most global real time monitoring networks are plugged into this database. The data sources are the following:
 ARGO (autonomous drifting profilers)
 The global network of moored buoys comprising the TAO/TRITON, PIRATA and RAMA arrays
 EGO (underwater gliders)
 GTSPP (channel of real-time data distribution maintained by the US institute NOAA)
 GOSUD thermosalinograph data coming from opportunity ships
 GTS (BATHY, TESSAC, drifting buoys messages) channel of low resolution data distribution
 Sea mammals equipped with sensors (seals and sea elephants)
 other datasets integrated in delayed-time (CTD, XBT, oceanographic cruises,...)

Versions

References

External links
 official website of CORIOLIS project
 official website of MyOcean project

Databases in France
Environmental science databases